The 1930 New South Wales state election was for 90 electoral districts each returning a single member with compulsory preferential voting. The principal change from the 1927 election was the division of the state into 3 zones, Sydney with forty-three districts, Newcastle with five, and the country with forty-two. While the average number of enrolled voters per electorate was 16,009, in the country zone the average was 13,028,, in Newcastle 18,933, and Sydney 18,580.

Results by electoral district

Albury 

John Ross won the seat at the 1927 election as a Nationalist however he resigned from the party before the election, and contested the seat as an Independent Nationalist

Annandale

Armidale

Arncliffe 

Joseph Cahill was the sitting member for the abolished district of St George which was largely replaced by Arncliffe.

Ashburnham

Ashfield

Auburn

Balmain 

The sitting member H. V. Evatt	() was appointed to the High Court.

Bankstown

Barwon

Bathurst

Bondi 

Sitting member Harold Jaques had won the 1927 election as an independent nationalist but rejoined the Nationalist party.

Botany 

Bulli 

Andrew Lysaght was the sitting member for Illawarra.

Burwood

Byron

Canterbury

Casino 

The 1929 redistribution increased the number of seats in the rural zone, and Casino was created from parts of Tenterfield and Clarence both of which were held by the Country Party.

Castlereagh 

The sitting member was Harold Thorby who unsuccessfully contested [[Results of the 1930 New South Wales state election#Dubbo|Dubbo]].

Cessnock

Clarence

Cobar 

Cobar was a re-created seat, and comprised part of the districts of [[Results of the 1930 New South Wales state election#Sturt|Sturt]], [[Results of the 1930 New South Wales state election#Lachlan|Lachlan]] and [[Results of the 1930 New South Wales state election#Namoi|Namoi]]. Mat Davidson (Labor) was the member for [[Results of the 1930 New South Wales state election#Murray|Murray]].

Concord 

Concord was a new seat, and comprised part of the district of [[Results of the 1930 New South Wales state election#Ryde|Ryde]] and the abolished district of Eastwood. Henry McDicken (Labor) was the member for Ryde.

Coogee

Cootamundra

Corowa

Croydon

Drummoyne

Dubbo 

Dubbo was a re-created district. Harold Thorby was the sitting member for [[Results of the 1930 New South Wales state election#Castlereagh|Castlereagh]].

Dulwich Hill

Georges River

Glebe

Gloucester

Gordon

Goulburn

Granville

Hamilton 

The sitting member was James Smith (Labor) who did not contest the election. Hugh Connell (Labor) was the sitting member for the abolished district of Kahibah.

Hartley

Hawkesbury

Hornsby

Hurstville

Illawarra 

The sitting member was Andrew Lysaght (Labor) who successfully contested [[Results of the 1930 New South Wales state election#Bulli|Bulli]]. Billy Davies (Labor) was the sitting member for the abolished district of Wollongong.

King

Kogarah 

Mark Gosling (Labor) was the sitting member for the abolished district of Oatley.

Kurri Kurri

Lachlan

Lakemba

Lane Cove

Leichhardt

Lismore

Liverpool Plains

Maitland

Manly

Marrickville

Monaro

Mosman

Mudgee

Murray 

The sitting member for Murray, Mat Davidson (Labor) successfully contested [[Results of the 1930 New South Wales state election#Cobar|Cobar]].

Murrumbidgee

Namoi

Nepean

Neutral Bay

Newcastle

Newtown

North Sydney

Orange

Oxley

Paddington 

The sitting member was Daniel Levy who successfully contested [[Results of the 1930 New South Wales state election#Woollahra|Woollahra]]

Parramatta

Petersham 

Joe Lamaro (Labor) was the sitting member for the abolished district of Enmore which was largely replaced by Petersham.

Phillip

Raleigh

Randwick

Redfern

Ryde

South Coast

Sturt

Tamworth

Temora

Tenterfield

Upper Hunter

Vaucluse

Wagga Wagga

Waratah 

Robert Cameron (Labor) was the sitting member for the abolished district of Wallsend which was partly replaced by Waratah.

Waverley 

Guy Arkins (Nationalist) was the sitting member for the aboslied district of Rockdale.

Willoughby

Wollondilly

Woollahra

Yass

Young

See also 

 Candidates of the 1930 New South Wales state election
 Members of the New South Wales Legislative Assembly, 1930–1932

Notes

References 

1930